Sasha Corbin (born 23 April 1988 in London) is an English international netball player.  At the club level she represents Hertfordshire Mavericks.

Corbin played for Hertfordshire Mavericks in the Netball Superleague inaugural season.  She has also played for Team Bath, Loughborough Lightning, Northern Mystics.  She made her debut with the England national team in 2007, and competed at the 2014 Commonwealth Games, where England lost the bronze medal match to Jamaica to finish fourth.

References 

1988 births
Living people
English netball players
Netball Superleague players
Sportspeople from London
Netball players at the 2014 Commonwealth Games
Loughborough Lightning netball players
Mavericks netball players
Team Bath netball players
New South Wales state netball league players
English expatriate netball people in New Zealand
English expatriate netball people in Australia
Northern Mystics players
ANZ Premiership players